Silos & Smokestacks National Heritage Area (SSNHA), also known as America's Agricultural Heritage Partnership is one of 49 federally designated National Heritage Areas in the nation and is an Affiliated Area of the National Park Service. Through the development of a network of sites, programs and events, SSNHA's mission is to interpret farm life, agribusiness and rural communities-past and present.

Silos & Smokestacks was designated as a national heritage area in 1996.  The name is intended to reflect both the farms and industries that constitute agribusiness.  The Silos & Smokestacks region covers the northeast third of the state of Iowa, including thirty-seven counties. The cities of Des Moines, Cedar Rapids, Davenport, Waterloo, Dubuque, and Iowa City are all located within the region.  The National Park Service recognizes over 90 community and privately operated sites in the area that interpret the story of American agriculture.  These range from dairy farms and museums to vineyards and tractor assembly plants.  Included in the area are the Amana Colonies, Living History Farms, and Brucemore, a few of Iowa's best known tourist attractions.  Silos & Smokestacks also includes several state-designated scenic byways and the nationally designated Great River Road along the west bank of the Mississippi River.

References 

National Heritage Areas of the United States
1996 establishments in Iowa
Protected areas established in 1996
Geography of Des Moines, Iowa
Geography of Cedar Rapids, Iowa
Geography of Davenport, Iowa
Waterloo, Iowa
Dubuque, Iowa
Iowa City, Iowa